The 1987–88 Nationalliga A season was the 50th season of the Nationalliga A, the top level of ice hockey in Switzerland. 10 teams participated in the league, and HC Lugano won the championship.

First round

Playoffs

Semifinals 

 HC Lugano - HC Davos 10:1, 3:4 OT, 8:1, 4:3 OT
 EHC Kloten - HC Ambrì-Piotta 7:4, 8:3, 2:5, 6:5

3rd place
Best of Three

 HC Ambrì-Piotta - HC Davos 8:1, 9:3

Final 
 HC Lugano - EHC Kloten 5:3, 10:4, 4:3

External links
 Championnat de Suisse 1987/88

Swiss
1987–88 in Swiss ice hockey